Desiree Freier (born July 24, 1996) is an American track and field athlete known primarily for the pole vault.  She is the current ratified junior national record holder from her  set on her 18th birthday in Eugene, Oregon while taking the silver medal at the 2014 World Junior Championships.  Two competitors, including her future teammate at the University of Arkansas, Lexi Weeks, have since surpassed that mark, but they have yet to be ratified.

Freier, Weeks and Week's twin sister Vicky were a powerful triple threat for Arkansas from 2015 until 2019.  Freier set her personal best indoors  at the 2019 NCAA Indoor Championships.

Prior to Arkansas, she competed for Northwest High School near Ft. Worth, Texas.

References

External links

Arkansas Razorbacks women's track and field athletes
1996 births
Living people
American female pole vaulters
Sportspeople from Fort Worth, Texas